= NCHPAD =

The National Center on Health, Physical Activity and Disability (abbreviated NCHPAD, formerly the National Center on Physical Activity and Disability or NCPAD) is an US based information center and public health practice concerned with physical activity and disability. The mission of the NCHPAD is to promote substantial health benefits that can be gained from participating in regular physical activity.

It was founded in 1999 as part of the Department of Disability and Human Development in the College of Applied Health Sciences at the University of Illinois at Chicago. It is supported by grants from the Centers for Disease Control and Prevention (CDC).

In 2012 the Center moved to the campus of the Lakeshore Foundation in Birmingham, Alabama, and Rimmer was made the inaugural "Lakeshore Foundation Endowed Chair in Health Promotion and Rehabilitation Sciences" at the University of Alabama at Birmingham's School of Health Professions. In 2021 the CDC increased its support for the program to $25 million over five years.
